A Boy of Flanders is a 1924 American silent family drama film directed by Victor Schertzinger and written by Max Abramson. It is based on the 1872 novel A Dog of Flanders by Ouida. The film stars Jackie Coogan, Nigel De Brulier, and Lionel Belmore. The film was released on April 7, 1924, by Metro-Goldwyn.

Plot
As described in a film magazine review, left orphaned by the death of his mother, Nello is dependent upon his old blind grandfather who sells milk in the village. The child assumes all household responsibilities and takes his grandfather about. His only friend is Alois Cogez and her mother, but her father hates the boy and makes life hard for him. Nello nurses back to health Petrasche, a poor beaten dog, and they become fast friends. Things go from bad to worse and Nello finally decides he can fight it no longer. He goes out into the storm of the night prepared to die, but his faithful dog finds him, he is restored and told that he has won the art prize and is to be adopted by Jan Van Dullen, the noted artist.

Cast

Preservation
A print of A Boy of Flanders exists at the Gosfilmofond in Russia.

References

External links

Still at gettyimages.com

1924 drama films
1924 films
Silent American drama films
American silent feature films
American black-and-white films
Films based on British novels
Films based on works by Ouida
Metro-Goldwyn-Mayer films
Films directed by Victor Schertzinger
1920s American films